Janna  (Polish: Janka) is a 1989 German-Polish children's television series. Set in the 1920s in a Polish village, the story recounts the adventures of Janna, the daughter of an innkeeper. In 1990, the concept was spun off into a television movie of the same name.

Synopsis
The series is set in a Polish village in the 1920s and is about the adventures of the innkeeper's daughter Janna and two gangs of children, the "Wolves" and the "Eagles". After a duel between the gangs, Janna receives a ring from her dying aunt, who tells her that it has magical powers. The competition between the children's gangs is also reflected in the conflict between the adults: the conservative grandfather Nowak and the progressive Jakob Bromski, who introduces airplanes and electricity to the town, repeatedly clash. Janna's mother has a difficult relationship with her father and, against his will, is very fond of Jakob.

Cast and characters
Polish version
 Agnieszka Krukówna as Janka Nowak
 Tadeusz Horvath as Julek Bromski
 Krzysztof Kowalewski as Oskar Nowak
 Joanna Żółkowska as Mother Marta
 Grzegorz Wons as Jakub Bromski
 Zofia Merle as servant Adela

German version
 Eva Michaelis as Janna Nowak
 Jan-David Rönfeldt as Julek Bromski
 Franz Josef Steffens as Oskar Nowak
 Monika Gabriel as Mother Marta
 Christian Brückner as Jakub Bromski
 Ursula Vogel as servant Adela

References

External links
 

1980s Polish television series
1989 Polish television series debuts
1989 Polish television series endings
1989 German television series debuts
1989 German television series endings
Television series set in the 1920s
Polish-language television shows
Das Erste original programming